Warren Wilson may refer to:

People
 Warren B. Wilson, American professor of art and fine artist
 Warren Elvin Wilson, American professor of civil engineering and college administrator
 Warren Hugh Wilson, American rural sociologist and Presbyterian pastor

Others
 Warren Wilson Beach House, a Los Angeles, California structure listed on the National Register of Historic Places 
 Warren Wilson College, a U.S. private liberal arts college in Swannanoa, North Carolina